HMS Elizabeth was a Spanish dispatch cutter named Elizabet that HMS Bacchante captured off Havana in 1805. The British Royal Navy took her into service under her existing name. She disappeared in 1807, believed foundered without a trace.

Capture
On 3 April 1805, Bacchante captured the Spanish naval cutter or schooner Elizabeth of ten guns and 47 men under the command of Don Josef Fer Fexegron. Elizabeth had been carrying dispatches from the Spanish governor of Pensacola, but had thrown these overboard before her capture.

HMS, and loss
The Royal Navy commissioned Elizabeth in 1806 under Lieutenant John Sedley. She disappeared c. September 1807 without a trace, presumed to have foundered with all hands.

See also
List of people who disappeared mysteriously at sea

Notes

Citations

References
Gilly, William O.S. (1864) Narratives of Shipwrecks of the Royal Navy Between 1793 and 1857 Compiled Principally from Official Documents in the Admiralty. (Longman, Green). 
 
 

1800s missing person cases
1800s ships
Captured ships
Cutters of the Royal Navy
Maritime incidents in 1807
Missing ships
People lost at sea
Warships lost with all hands